Qanyaruq-e Pain (also Romanized as Qānyārūq-e Pā’īn; also known as Guniarūkh Pāīn, Qanīāroq-e Pā’īn, Qānyāroq-e Soflá, Qānyārūq-e Soflá, and Qonyārūq-e Soflā) is a village in Sedeh Rural District, in the Central District of Arak County, Markazi Province, Iran. At the 2006 census, its population was 27, in 9 families.

References 

Populated places in Arak County